Indianola Community School District is a public school district headquartered in Indianola, Iowa. The district is completely within Warren County, and serves the city of Indianola and surrounding areas including the towns of Ackworth and Sandyville.

Indianola Community School District is bordered by the school districts of Carlisle, Clarke, Des Moines Independent, Interstate 35, Martensdale-St. Mary's, Norwalk, Pleasantville, and Southeast Warren.

Schools
The district operates six schools, all in Indianola:
 Emerson Elementary School
 Irving Elementary School
 Whittier Elementary School
 Wilder Elementary School
 Indianola Middle School
 Indianola High School

Closed Schools
Indianola Junior High School
Hawthorne Elementary School

Indianola High School

Athletics
The Indians compete in the Little Hawkeye Conference in the following sports:

Baseball
Basketball (boys and girls)
 Boys' 2001 Class 4A State Champions
Bowling
Cross Country (boys and girls)
 Boys' two-time State Champions (1971, 1972)
Football
Golf (boys and girls)
Soccer (boys and girls)
Softball
 2012 Class 4A State Champions
Swimming (boys and girls)
Tennis (boys and girls)
Track and Field (boys and girls)
 Boys' - 1958 State Champions
 Girls' - 5-time Class 3A State Champions (1978, 1979, 1980, 1993, 1994)
Volleyball
Wrestling
 1994 Class 3A State Champions

See also
List of school districts in Iowa
List of high schools in Iowa

References

External links
 Indianola Community School District

School districts in Iowa
Education in Warren County, Iowa